Alfalfa was an unincorporated community in Marengo County, Alabama, United States. It has since been annexed into the adjacent city of Demopolis. Alfalfa had a post office at one time, but it no longer exists.

Geography

Demographics
Alfalfa never reported a population figure separately on the U.S. Census as an unincorporated community on the U.S. Census according to the census returns from 1850-2010. It has since been annexed into Demopolis.

References

Unincorporated communities in Alabama
Unincorporated communities in Marengo County, Alabama